Ian Robert Hughes (born 13 March 1972) is an English former professional rugby league footballer who played in the 1990s and 2000s.

Background
Ian Hughes was born in Leeds, West Riding of Yorkshire, and after his rugby league career he became a police officer.

Genealogical Information
Ian Hughes is the older brother of the rugby league footballer; Adam Hughes.

References

External links
Seal's late show keeps Keighley top
London hit trough in The Valley

1972 births
Living people
Dewsbury Rams players
English rugby league players
Hull Kingston Rovers players
Hunslet R.L.F.C. players
Keighley Cougars players
Newcastle Thunder players
Rugby league players from Leeds
Rugby league second-rows
Sheffield Eagles (1984) players
Wakefield Trinity players